Agonopterix tabghaella is a moth in the family Depressariidae. It was described by Hans Georg Amsel in 1953. It is found in North Africa.

References

Moths described in 1953
Agonopterix
Moths of Africa